The discography of Trivium, an American heavy metal band, consists of ten studio albums, three extended play, two demo albums, 42 singles and 32 music videos. Formed in Orlando, Florida in 1999, the group's first recording lineup included vocalist and guitarist Matt Heafy, bassist Brent Young and drummer Travis Smith, who together released Ember to Inferno on Lifeforce Records in 2003. After the addition of guitarist Corey Beaulieu and new bassist Paolo Gregoletto in place of Young, the band signed with Roadrunner Records and released Ascendancy in 2005, which reached number 151 on the US Billboard 200. It also reached number 79 on the UK Albums Chart and was certified gold by the British Phonographic Industry (BPI). The Crusade followed in 2006, peaking at number 25 on the Billboard 200 and number 7 on the UK Albums Chart. The album's second single "Anthem (We Are the Fire)" reached number 40 on the UK Singles Chart and topped the UK Rock & Metal Singles Chart, while its third single "The Rising" was the band's first to register on the Billboard Hot Mainstream Rock Tracks chart, reaching number 32.

After the release of 2008's Shogun, which reached number 23 in the US and number 17 in the UK, Smith was replaced by Nick Augusto, who first performed on the single "Shattering the Skies Above" for the album God of War: Blood & Metal. The band's fifth studio album In Waves was released the following year, becoming the first album by the band to reach the top 20 of the US Billboard 200 when it peaked at number 13. The album's title track registered on the UK Rock & Metal Singles Chart, while "Built to Fall" and "Black" featured on the Billboard Active Rock chart. Vengeance Falls, released in 2013, peaked at number 15 in the US and number 23 in the UK, spawning the Billboard Mainstream Rock and UK Rock & Metal Singles Chart top 40 single "Strife". "Villainy Thrives" also registered on the Mainstream Rock chart at number 40. Augusto was replaced by Mat Madiro in 2014. The band released Silence in the Snow in 2015, which peaked at number 19 in both the US and the UK. The single "Until the World Goes Cold" was the band's first to reach the top ten of the Billboard Mainstream Rock Tracks chart, peaking at number 10.

In December 2016, Trivium released a deluxe edition of debut album Ember to Inferno subtitled Ab Initio, which contained both early demos as well as the 2004 Flavus demo. The album charted in Australia at number 85. Following the addition of new drummer Alex Bent, the band released The Sin and the Sentence in October 2017.

Albums

Studio albums

Demo albums

Extended plays

Singles

Music videos

Other appearances

See also
List of songs recorded by Trivium

References

Heavy metal group discographies
Discographies of American artists